Epicarsia is a genus of moths of the family Erebidae. The genus was erected by George Hampson in 1926.

Species
Epicarsia bigutta Walker, 1858
Epicarsia diagramma Hampson, 1926

References

Calpinae